Abraham van den Tempel (c.1622 – 8 October 1672) was a Dutch Golden Age painter.

Biography

He probably learned painting from his father, also a painter, but who died when he was still quite young, in 1636. That is the same year that he moved to Amsterdam, where he stayed until 1647, whereupon he moved to Leiden. According to Houbraken he was the son of a Mennonite preacher in Leeuwarden who was a respected art teacher. His father was Lambert Jacobsz (or Jacobszoon), who had taught Govert Flinck and Jacob Adriaensz Backer in their youth, both of whom were artists from Mennonite families. Abraham took the name Tempel because when he studied in Leiden, he lived in a house there with a relief of a Tempel in the keystone. He became a pupil of Jacob Backer, and studied mathematics at Leiden University. He met with great success with the Leiden city council, earning several generous commissions, including a series of three large allegorical paintings on the cloth industry of Leiden for the Cloth Hall which still hang in their original place today in the Stedelijk Museum De Lakenhal.

He became master of the Guild of St. Luke in 1657 and in 1659 he was chartermaster. In 1660 he returned to Amsterdam. His pupils were Frans van Mieris the Elder, Carel de Moor, Michiel van Musscher, Ary de Vois, and Isaac Paling.

Gallery

References

External links
Abraham van den Tempel at PubHist

1622 births
1672 deaths
Dutch Golden Age painters
Dutch male painters
People from Leeuwarden
Painters from Leiden